The Pat O'Brien Stakes is a Grade II American Thoroughbred horse race for three-year-olds and older over a distance of seven furlongs on the dirt track scheduled annually in August at Del Mar Racetrack in Del Mar, California. The event currently carries a purse of $200,000.

History

The race was named in honor of actor and Del Mar Racetrack co-founder, Pat O'Brien (1899–1983). Pat O'Brien, a classic character movie actor who often appeared in a James Cagney starring vehicle, loved the races.

The inaugural running of the event was on 25 September 1980, the twelfth and final day of the Del Mar Fair meeting. The event was for two-year-olds, over a distance of  furlongs on the turf track and was won by Elmendorf Farm's Seafood in a time of 1:30. The following year the L.A. County Fair was moved to Pomona Fairgrounds and the event was idle.

In 1986 the administration of Del Mar renewed the event during their summer meeting as a sprint handicap over seven furlongs on the dirt.

Between 1990–1995 and 2004–2006 the race had Breeders' Cup incentives which were reflected in the name of the event.

The event was classified a Grade III event in 1994 and upgraded to Grade II in 1999. In 2009 the event became a Grade I and after three runnings it was downgraded back to a Grade II stakes.

Of the notable winners of the event are Lit de Justice who won in 1995 in stakes record time, the following year he won the Breeders' Cup Sprint. The 1996 winner Alphabet Soup used the sprint event in his campaign which led to a victory in the Breeders' Cup Classic. The 2014 winner Goldencents went on to win his second Breeders' Cup Dirt Mile.

Records
Speed record:
7 furlongs (dirt): 1:20.06 – Lit de Justice (1995)  
7 furlongs (Polytrack): 1:20.99 – Goldencents (2014)

Margins:
 lengths – Catalina Cruiser (2018)

Most wins:
 2 – Catalina Cruiser (2018, 2019)
 2 – Disturbingthepeace (2002, 2003)

Most wins by a jockey:
 6 – Victor Espinoza (2001, 2002, 2003, 2005, 2007, 2009)

Most wins by a trainer:
 8 – Bob Baffert (2000, 2001, 2009, 2010, 2011, 2012, 2013, 2022)

Most wins by an owner:
 2 – Hronis Racing (2018, 2019)
 2 – Rita & David Milch (2002, 2003)

Winners

Legend:

See also
List of American and Canadian Graded races

External links
 2020 Del Mar Media Guide

References

Del Mar Racetrack
Horse races in California
Grade 2 stakes races in the United States
Open mile category horse races
Recurring events established in 1980
Breeders' Cup Challenge series
1980 establishments in California